Muhammad Syamim bin Othman (born 6 January 1990) is a Malaysian footballer who plays for Penang as a goalkeeper.

Early life, family and education
Muhammad Syamim Othman was born in Kuala Lumpur.

Athletic career
He began his career with hometown team Selangor in 2007 when he was almost 18 years old. He later joined Harimau Muda B after impressing the national youth club. After spending a few years at the club, he joined Harimau Muda A for the U-21's once he exceeded the age limit for Harimau Muda B.

Syamim played for Johor in 2013. In the season of 2014, he was transferred to Selangor and was selected as the number one goalkeeper.

References

External links

Living people
Malaysian people of Malay descent
Malaysian footballers
Selangor FA players
1990 births
Sportspeople from Kuala Lumpur
Association football goalkeepers